The baobhan sith is a female fairy in the folklore of the Scottish Highlands, though they also share certain characteristics in common with the succubus. They appear as beautiful women who seduce their victims before attacking them and killing them.

Folklore 
According to the Scottish folklorist Donald Alexander Mackenzie, the baobhan sith usually appears as a beautiful young woman wearing a long green dress that conceals the deer hooves she has instead of feet. She may also take the form of a hooded crow or raven.

There are numerous stories about the baobhan sith with a general theme of hunters being attacked in the wilderness at night. In one tale recorded by Mackenzie, there were four men who went hunting and took shelter for the night in a lonely shieling or hut. One of the men supplied vocal music while the others began dancing. The men expressed a desire for partners to dance with, and soon after that four women entered the hut. Three of them danced while the fourth sat beside the vocalist. He then noticed drops of blood falling from his companions and fled from the hut, taking refuge among the horses. His partner chased him but was unable to catch him, and when daylight came she disappeared. The man went back inside and found all three of his friends dead and drained of blood. The folklorist Katharine Briggs suggested that the baobhan sith was unable to catch the fourth man among the horses because of the iron with which the horses were shod, iron being a traditional fairy vulnerability.

In a similar tale one of the men noticed that the women had deer hooves instead of feet and fled from them. He returned the next morning to find that the other hunters had their "throats cut and chests laid open".

In a third story the hunters took refuge in a cave. Each of the men said he wished his own sweetheart were there that night, but one of them, named Macphee, who was accompanied by his black dog, said he preferred his wife to remain at home. At that moment a group of young women entered the cave, and the men who had wished for their sweethearts were killed. Macphee was protected by his dog who drove the women from the cave.

One recurring motif in these stories is that the baobhan sith appear almost immediately after the hunters express their desire for female companionship. This is connected with a traditional Scottish belief that if one were to make a wish at night without also invoking God's protection, then that wish would be granted in some terrible manner.

In popular culture 
 The baobhan sith have appeared on a number of occasions in author Mark Chadbourn's fantasy trilogies The Age of Misrule, The Dark Age, and Kingdom of the Serpent. 
 Baobhan sith are mentioned in Nicole Peeler's Tempest Rising series.
 They are also mentioned in Michael Scott's The Magician: The Secrets of the Immortal Nicholas Flamel. 
 They appear in Faerie Tale by Raymond E. Feist where they are portrayed as evil fairies of the Unseelie Court, who (aside from their great beauty) possess a strong compelling magic which they use to force solitary males in isolated locations to follow them to their deaths. 
 Cornelia Amiri is the author of the Dancing Vampire romance series of six novellas: Dance of the Vampires, Vampire Highland Fling, A Bonnie Vampire Dancer, Vampire Waltz, Valkyrie Vampire Sword Dancing, and Some Vampires Shimmy. The series is about seven baobhan sith sisters and each book features a different sister as they fall in love.
 Desdemona, an Oriental dancer and commander of the Fae army in Amy Hoff's Scottish urban fantasy series Caledonia, is a baobhan sith.
 In Night and Silence, the twelfth installment of Seanan McGuire's October Daye series, the protagonist is attacked and repeatedly bitten by a starving baobhan sith. In this portrayal, a baobhan sith is able to mimic both the appearance and supernatural abilities of anyone whose blood she has recently consumed.
 A baobhan sith appears as an adversary in the Fighting Fantasy gamebook "Vault of the Vampire".
 In The Book of Life (Harkness novel) from the All Souls Trilogy, the baobhan sith was said to have been inspired by Janet Gowdie, a Vampire-Witch hybrid and daughter of the real falsely accused witch Isobel Gowdie and a vampire named Nickie-Ben.
 Baobhan Sith the feature film was released in 2017. It was produced by Scottish independent company Eyedoll Productions and was written and directed by David W Hutchison. It was inspired by the Baobhan Sith legend and features Polish actor Joanna Kaczynska as the Baobhan Sith.
 A Baobhan Sith appeared as an Archer-class Servant in the video game "Fate/Grand Order", where she is designed by Mochizuki Kei and voiced by Azumi Waki.
 Scarlett Johansson's character in Under the Skin is thought to be loosely based on the legend of baobhan sith.

See also 
 Banshee
 Dames Blanches
 Deer Woman
 Glaistig
 Hulder
 Leanan sídhe
 Patasola
 Rusalka
 Samodiva
 Sayona
 Sundel Bolong
 Aicha Kandicha

References 

Fairies
Fantasy creatures
Female legendary creatures
Mythological hematophages
Scottish legendary creatures
Scottish folklore
Vampires